Charlie Wade (born October 8, 1963) is the head coach of the University of Hawaii men's volleyball program.

Coaching career
Wade spent 11 years at the University of Hawai'i with the Rainbow Wahine volleyball staff, nine as an associate coach to Dave Shoji, help guiding Hawaii to 11 conference championships, 11 consecutive NCAA tournament appearances, six Regional Finals, and four Final Fours. During that time span, Hawaii held a conference record of 160-1, an overall record of 310-39 and an NCAA Championship match in 1996. Wade was also instrumental in producing eight All-Americans and 18 All-America awards, including two National Players of the Year.

Wade departed Hawaii after the 2005 season to accept the head coaching position for the women's team at Pacific. Wade served as head coach of the women's volleyball program at the University of the Pacific from 2006–2008.

After being out of coaching for a year, Wade was named head coach for the men's team at the University of Hawaii following the resignation of Mike Wilton.

After leading the Rainbow Warriors to the NCAA title match, Wade was named 2019 AVCA Coach of the Year.

Personal life and education

In 1981, Wade graduated Warsaw Community High School (Warsaw, IN), and received a bachelor's degree in kinesiology from Cal State Fullerton in 1991.

Wade is married to former University of Washington volleyball player Tani Martin, with whom he has three sons, Makana, Kainoa & Kekoa.

Misconduction allegation
In April 2019, Wade was put under investigation for misconduct against a female player in California when he was coaching a club volleyball team, an allegation which led to the resignation of Long Beach State assistant Scott Touzinsky. Wade was cleared of all misconduct  by the United States Center for SafeSport in January 2020, and was able to claim his AVCA coach of the year award.

Head coaching record

Women's

Men's

Notes

References

1963 births
Living people
American volleyball coaches
Sportspeople from Redondo Beach, California
California State University, Fullerton alumni
Hawaii Rainbow Wahine volleyball coaches
Hawaii Rainbow Warriors volleyball coaches